Szeląg may refer to the following places in Poland:
Szeląg, Poznań, a neighbourhood in the city of Poznań
Szeląg, Warmian-Masurian Voivodeship, a village in north Poland
szeląg - Polish shilling